Hamidreza Fouladgar is an Iranian conservative politician and former member of the Parliament of Iran representing Isfahan electoral district.

References

1959 births
Living people
Members of the 7th Islamic Consultative Assembly
Members of the 8th Islamic Consultative Assembly
Members of the 9th Islamic Consultative Assembly
Members of the 10th Islamic Consultative Assembly
Islamic Society of Engineers politicians
Islamic Republican Party politicians
Iran University of Science and Technology alumni
Islamic Azad University alumni
Politicians from Isfahan
Popular Front of Islamic Revolution Forces politicians
Iranian industrial engineers